Curtitoma becklemishevi is a species of sea snail, a marine gastropod mollusk in the family Mangeliidae.

Description
The length of the shell varies between 5 mm and 8 mm.

Distribution
This marine species occurs in the Sea of Japan and in the Okhotsk Sea.

References

 BOGDANOV, IP. "7 NEW SPECIES OF SUBFAMILY OENOPOTINAE FROM THE OKHOTSK SEA." ZOOLOGICHESKY ZHURNAL 68.11 (1989): 147–152.

External links
  Tucker, J.K. 2004 Catalog of recent and fossil turrids (Mollusca: Gastropoda). Zootaxa 682:1-1295.
 Gulbin, Vladimir V. "Review of the Shell-bearing Gastropods in the Russian Waters of the East Sea (Sea of Japan). III. Caenogastropoda: Neogastropoda." The Korean Journal of Malacology 25.1 (2009): 51-70

becklemishevi